Travis Smikle (born 7 May 1992) is a Jamaican athlete. He competed for Jamaica in discus at the 2012 Summer Olympics.

He has qualified to represent Jamaica at the 2020 Summer Olympics.

References

External links
 
 
 

1992 births
Living people
Jamaican male discus throwers
Athletes (track and field) at the 2012 Summer Olympics
Athletes (track and field) at the 2018 Commonwealth Games
Olympic athletes of Jamaica
Jamaican sportspeople in doping cases
Doping cases in athletics
Commonwealth Games medallists in athletics
Commonwealth Games silver medallists for Jamaica
Central American and Caribbean Games bronze medalists for Jamaica
Competitors at the 2018 Central American and Caribbean Games
Athletes (track and field) at the 2019 Pan American Games
Pan American Games silver medalists for Jamaica
Pan American Games medalists in athletics (track and field)
Central American and Caribbean Games medalists in athletics
Medalists at the 2019 Pan American Games
Athletes (track and field) at the 2020 Summer Olympics
20th-century Jamaican people
21st-century Jamaican people
Medallists at the 2018 Commonwealth Games